Stephen Daldry is an English director of stage and screen.

He has received two BAFTA Awards, two Primetime Emmy Awards, and three Tony Awards. He has received three Academy Awards nominations for Best Director, for films Billy Elliot (2000), The Hours (2002), and The Reader (2008).

From 2016 to 2020, he produced and directed the Netflix television series The Crown, for which he received one Producers Guild Award nomination, one Producers Guild Award win, two Primetime Emmy Award nominations, and one Primetime Emmy Award win for Outstanding Directing for a Drama Series and Outstanding Drama Series. Daldry joined an elite group of directors by receiving nominations for direction in theatre, television, and film.

For his work in theatre he has received various awards and nominations including four Tony Award nominations and three Laurence Olivier Award nominations. He won three Tony Awards for An Inspector Calls (1994), Billy Elliott (2009), and The Inheritance (2020). He received a Laurence Olivier Award for Directing The Inheritance.

Major associations

Academy Awards

BAFTA Awards

Emmy Awards

Golden Globe Awards

Laurence Olivier Awards

Tony Awards

Notes

References 

Lists of awards received by film director